Seybold is a surname. Notable people with the surname include:

John Seybold (criminal) (1923–2005), American jewel thief who authored The Home Invaders: Confessions of a Cat Burglar under the pen name Frank Hohimer
John States Seybold (1897–1984), Governor of the Panama Canal Zone from 1952 to 1956
John W. Seybold (1916–2004), the father of computer typesetting
Natalie Seybold (born 1965), American former pair skater
Patricia Seybold, CEO of Patricia Seybold Group
Socks Seybold (1870–1921), baseball player
Wayne Seybold (born 1963), American pair skater and politician

See also
Seybold Building and Arcade located in Downtown Miami, Florida
Kelsey-Seybold Clinic, large multi-specialty clinic system located in Greater Houston
Seybold Baking Company Factory, historic building at 800 Orange Avenue in Daytona Beach
Seybold Seminars, seminar and trade show for the desktop publishing and pre-press industry
Sebold (disambiguation)
Seibold

Surnames from given names